The  is a Japanese railway line that connects Dentetsu-Toyama Station in Toyama, Toyama with Unazuki Onsen Station in Kurobe, Toyama. It is owned and run by Toyama Chihō Railway.

Station list

History
The first section of what is now this line was opened by Tateyama Light Railway as a  gauge line between Gohyakkoku (on the Toyama Chiho Railway Tateyama Line) and Namerikawa in 1913.

The Kurobe Railway opened the Dentetsu Kurobe to Unazuki Onsen section as a  gauge line between 1922 and 1923.

In 1932, the Toyama Electric Railway acquired the Tateyama Light Railway, and built a line from Dentetsu-Toyama to Namerikawa, regauging some of the original line to 1,067 mm gauge, and electrifying it at 1,500 V DC.

The Namerikawa to Dentetsu Kurobe section was opened between 1935 and 1936, and the Kurobe Railway was merged with the Toyama Electric Railway in 1943 to create the current company, with the electrification to Unazuki Onsen commissioned the same year.

CTC signalling was commissioned on the line between 1966 and 1967, and the Dentetsu-Toyama to Inarimachi section was double-tracked in 1969. Freight services ceased in 1983.

See also
 Tateyama Kurobe Alpine Route

References
This article incorporates material from the corresponding article in the Japanese Wikipedia.

Rail transport in Toyama Prefecture
1067 mm gauge railways in Japan